Len is a masculine given name, usually a short form (hypocorism) of Leonard. It may refer to:

People:
 Len Attley (1910–1979), Welsh footballer
 Len Barry (1942–2020), American singer, songwriter and record producer
 Len Beadell (1923–1995), Australian surveyor, road builder, bushman, artist and author
 Len Berman (born 1947), American television sportscaster and journalist
 Len Brown (disambiguation)
 Len Carlson (1937-2006), Canadian voice actor and former professional athlete
 Len Casey (born 1953), English former rugby league footballer, and coach
 Len Deighton (born 1929), British spy novelist
 Len Dockett (1920–2008), Australian rules footballer
 Len Dugan (1910–1967), American football player
 Len Evans (footballer) (1903–1977), Welsh international football goalkeeper
 Len Evans (wine) (1930–2006), Australian wine columnist
 Leonard Evans (1929–2016), Canadian politician
 Len Gabrielson (outfielder) (born 1940), retired Major League Baseball player
 Len Gabrielson (first baseman) (1915–2000), Major league Baseball player in April 1939, father of the above
 Len Goodman (born 1944), English professional ballroom dancer, dance judge and coach
 Len Hutton (1916-1990), English cricketer
 Len Hutton (athlete) (1908-1976), Canadian long and triple jumper
 Leonard B. Keller (1947-2009), US Army soldier awarded the Medal of Honor
 Len King (1925–2011), Australian politician, lawyer and judge
 Len Levy (1921–1999), American football player and professional wrestler
 Len Lye (1901-1980), New Zealand artist known primarily for his experimental films and kinetic sculpture
 Len McCluskey (born 1950), British trade unionist
 Len Peterson (1917-2008), Canadian playwright, screenwriter and novelist
 Len Peterson (footballer) (born 1946), former Australian rules footballer
 Len Phillips (1922–2011), English footballer
 Len Phillips (footballer, born 1890) (1890-1968), Australian rules footballer
 Len Phillips (footballer, born 1891) (1891-1978), Australian rules footballer
 Len Reynolds (politician) (1923-1980), Australian politician

Fictional characters:
 Major Len Creighton, a character from Stephen King's The Stand
 Len Kagamine, a Vocaloid from Vocaloid 2
 Len Reynolds, in the British soap opera Emmerdale
 Len, the feature character from the manga Video Girl Len
 Len (Tsukihime), from the visual novel Tsukihime by TYPE-MOON
Bishop Leonard Brennan, a character in the sitcom Father Ted, who is sometimes referred to as "Len".

Masculine given names
Hypocorisms